Bryan County is a county in the U.S. state of Oklahoma. As of the 2010 census, the population was 42,416. Its county seat is Durant. It is the only county in the United States named for Democratic politician William Jennings Bryan.

Bryan County comprises the Durant, OK Micropolitan Statistical Area, which is part of the Dallas-Fort Worth and the Texoma region, TX-OK Combined Statistical Area. The city of Durant has the headquarters of the Choctaw Nation of Oklahoma.

Bryan County consists of 10 Townships: Albany, Bennington, Bokchito, Brown, Caddo, Calera, Colbert, Kemp, Matoy, and Speairs.

History

The area now known as Bryan County was occupied by the Choctaw tribe in 1831–2.  After the tribe reestablished its government in the Indian Territory, it included much of the area within Blue County, a part of the Pushmataha District of the Choctaw Nation.

In 1845, the tribe opened Armstrong Academy for boys near the community of Bokchito. The academy served as Chahta Tamaha, the Choctaw capital, during the Civil War.

Bloomfield Academy, a school for Chickasaw girls, was opened in 1852, just south of the present town of Achille.

Prior to the Chickasaw removal to Indian Territory, the Chickasaw tribe bought part of the Choctaw allocation. The western quarter of today's Bryan County was made part of the Chickasaw District in 1837. When the two tribes formally separated into two distinct nations in 1855, the Chickasaw District became the Chickasaw Nation.

During the late 1850s, the Butterfield Overland Mail and Stage route followed the older Texas Road across the present county. General Albert Pike established Fort McCulloch for the Confederate Army near the present town of Kenefic on the Blue River.  Although no Civil War battles occurred in the vicinity, the fort was garrisoned by more than a thousand Indian troops whose leaders were allied with the Confederates.

After the Missouri, Kansas and Texas Railway (Katy) built a north–south line through this area in 1872, several new towns were created. One such town was Colbert, which became the seat of Blue County and the largest town in the Choctaw Nation. The St. Louis, San Francisco and New Orleans Railroad, later bought by the St. Louis and San Francisco Railway (Frisco), built an east–west line in 1903.

Just prior to statehood, when all tribal governments were dissolved, Blue County was extinguished. Bryan County was officially established on November 16, 1907, and Durant was designated as the county seat.

The Bridge War, also called the Red River Bridge War or the Toll Bridge War, was a 1931 bloodless boundary conflict between the U.S. states of Oklahoma and Texas over an existing toll bridge and a new free bridge crossing the Red River between Grayson County, Texas and Bryan County, Oklahoma.

Geography

Bryan County is in southeastern Oklahoma, in a 10-county area designated as Choctaw Country for tourism purposes by the Oklahoma Department of Tourism and Recreation.

The county is in the Coastal Plains physiographic region, and is drained mostly by the Blue River.  The Washita River originally drained much of the western part of the county, but now empties into Lake Texoma, which forms much of the southern boundary of the county. The county is a major part of the Texoma region.

Major highways

  US-69
  US-70
  US-75
  SH-91
  SH-70E
  SH-48
  SH-199
  SH-78

Adjacent counties
 Atoka County (north)
 Choctaw County (east)
 Lamar County, Texas (southeast)
 Fannin County, Texas (south)
 Grayson County, Texas (southwest)
 Marshall County (west)
 Johnston County (northwest)

Demographics

As of the census of 2000, there were 36,534 people, 14,422 households, and 9,936 families residing in the county.  The population density was 40 people per square mile (16/km2).  There were 16,715 housing units at an average density of 18 per square mile (7/km2).  The racial makeup of the county was 80.02% White, 1.42% Black or African American, 12.16% Native American, 0.44% Asian, 0.04% Pacific Islander, 1.08% from other races, and 4.84% from two or more races.  2.65% of the population were Hispanic or Latino of any race. 28.4% were of American, 10.1% Irish, 8.1% German and 6.7% English ancestry.

There were 14,422 households, out of which 30.40% had children under the age of 18 living with them, 54.00% were married couples living together, 10.80% had a female householder with no husband present, and 31.10% were non-families. 26.60% of all households were made up of individuals, and 11.50% had someone living alone who was 65 years of age or older.  The average household size was 2.47 and the average family size was 2.98.

In the county, the population was spread out, with 24.80% under the age of 18, 11.70% from 18 to 24, 25.70% from 25 to 44, 22.30% from 45 to 64, and 15.40% who were 65 years of age or older.  The median age was 36 years. For every 100 females there were 95.10 males.  For every 100 females age 18 and over, there were 92.40 males.

The median income for a household in the county was $27,888, and the median income for a family was $33,984. Males had a median income of $26,831 versus $20,087 for females. The per capita income for the county was $14,217.  About 14.00% of families and 18.40% of the population were below the poverty line, including 21.40% of those under age 18 and 17.00% of those age 65 or over.

Politics

Economy
Agriculture, tourism, manufacturing, and distribution are bedrocks of the county's economy. Tourism attractions include Lake Texoma, Lake Durant, the Choctaw Casino Resort, Choctaw Casino Bingo and Fort Washita.

Major employers in the region include the Choctaw Nation of Oklahoma, the headquarters of the J.C. Potter meat processing facility, Durant's Historic Central Business District and Retail District, a Cardinal Glass Industries manufacturing facility, AllianceHealth Durant, a Big Lots distribution center, the headquarters of First United Bank and First Texoma National Bank, Indian Nation Wholesale, and Wal-Mart.

Communities

City
 Durant (county seat)

Towns

 Achille
 Armstrong
 Bennington
 Bokchito
 Caddo
 Calera
 Colbert
 Hendrix
 Kemp
 Kenefic
 Mead
 Silo

Census-designated places

 Albany
 Blue
 Cartwright
 Platter
 Sand Point
 Utica

Other unincorporated communities

 Allison
 Banty
 Brown
 Cade
 Cobb
 Kiersey
 Romia
 Roberta
 Yarnaby
 Yuba

NRHP sites

The following sites in Bryan county are on the National Register of Historic Places.

References

Further reading
 Bryan County Heritage Association.  The History of Bryan County Oklahoma.  National ShareGraphics, 1983.  596.

External links
 Encyclopedia of Oklahoma History and Culture - Bryan County
 Oklahoma Digital Maps: Digital Collections of Oklahoma and Indian Territory

 
1907 establishments in Oklahoma
Populated places established in 1907